Dr. Sally Jepng'etich Kosgey (born 1949), is a Kenyan politician. She belongs to ODM and was elected to represent the Aldai Constituency in the National Assembly of Kenya in the 2007 Kenyan parliamentary election.

She was educated at Alliance Girls High School,. She obtained a BA degree from the University of Dar es Salaam in 1974. She later received her MA in 1975 and a Ph.D. in 1980, both from Stanford University in the United States.

She worked for various organisations, before being tapped by former President Daniel arap Moi where she worked in various posts culminating in her appointments as ambassador and head of public service/secretary to the cabinet.

She also served as minister for higher education science and technology in the coalition government which came about in 2008 after the post election violence. However, in April 2010, she swapped jobs with Agriculture Minister William Ruto.

In November 2017 an investigation conducted by the International Consortium of Investigative Journalism cited her name in the list of politicians named in "Paradise Papers" allegations.

References

Living people
Orange Democratic Movement politicians
Members of the National Assembly (Kenya)
Stanford University alumni
Alumni of Alliance Girls High School
Ministers of Agriculture of Kenya
Government ministers of Kenya
Women government ministers of Kenya
21st-century Kenyan women politicians
21st-century Kenyan politicians
People named in the Paradise Papers
1949 births